John Studley (1545?–1590?) was an English academic, known as a translator of Seneca. He contributed to the Seneca his tenne tragedies translated into English (1581), compiled by Thomas Newton and the sole printed translations of Seneca available in Elizabethan England; some echoes of his work have been detected in Shakespeare.

Life
Born about 1545, he was one of the original scholars of Westminster School, and the earliest to be elected to Cambridge. He matriculated from Trinity College, Cambridge, in 1561; his translations were made as an undergraduate. He graduated B. A. in 1566 and M.A. in 1570, being elected a fellow of the college in the interval.

Studley's religious opinions were strongly Calvinistic. On 1 February 1573 he was summoned before the heads of colleges at Cambridge on a charge of nonconformity. A few months later he vacated his fellowship. Nothing further is definitely known of his life.

Works
He made translations of four of Seneca's tragedies: Agamemnon, Medea, Hippolytus, and Hercules Oetaeus. He employed the common ballad metre for the dialogue, and rhyming decasyllabics for the choruses, but freely paraphrased his text. He also made deliberate changes. To the Agamemnon he added an unnecessary scene at the close, in which he re-narrated the death of Cassandra, the imprisonment of Electra, and the flight of Orestes. To the Medea he prefixed an original prologue and amplified the choruses. The Agamemnon and the Medea were both licensed for publication to Thomas Colwell in 1566, and the Hippolytus to Henry Denham in 1567. The Agamemnon was published in 1566 with a dedication to Sir William Cecil.

Studley wrote Latin elegies on the death of Nicholas Carr, the Greek professor at Cambridge, which were printed with the professor's Latin translation of Demosthenes in 1571. In 1574 he published with additions a translation of John Bale's Acta Pontificum Romanorum under the title of The Pageant of the Popes, conteyning the lyves of all the Bishops of Rome from the beginninge of them to the yeare 1555, London, 1574. It was dedicated to Thomas Radcliffe, 3rd Earl of Sussex.

Notes

References

1545 births
1590 deaths
Fellows of Trinity College, Cambridge
People educated at Westminster School, London
16th-century English translators
16th-century scholars
English male non-fiction writers